Tabbaya, Tobbaya, طبايا is a  local authority in the South Governorate in Lebanon. It is located 57 km south of Beirut and 15 km southeast of Sidon. It is  10 km inland from the Mediterranean, occupying a hill with elevation ranging between 400 and 410 meters above sea level.

References

External links
 
Aarab Tabbaya, Localiban

Populated places in Sidon District